Nikita Vadymovych Rukavytsya (born 22 June 1987) is a professional footballer who plays for Israeli Premier League club Maccabi Haifa. Born in Ukraine, he represents the Australia national team.

Early and personal life
Rukavytsya was born in Mykolayiv, in the then Ukrainian SSR of the Soviet Union; his family moved to Australia when he was 14 years old, settling in Perth. He played junior football for Inglewood United and Perth SC in the Football West State League while attending Mount Lawley Senior High School, before being offered a spot at the Australian Institute of Sport on a football scholarship.

Rukavytsya is married to an Israeli wife; hence, he obtained Israeli residency status in August 2016.

Club career
Rukavytsya joined Perth Glory on a short-term replacement deal in the latter stages of the 2006–07 A-League season, making three appearances for the club. In March 2007, he signed a contract with the Glory to keep him at the club until the end of the 2008–09 A-League season.

After an excellent pre-season, the start of the 2007–08 A-League season was difficult for both Rukavytsya and Perth Glory. However, with the departure of coach Ron Smith, Rukavytsya turned his form around starting by scoring two goals against the Newcastle Jets in David Mitchell's first game as coach and another two goals against Melbourne Victory at home on 2 December 2007. By the end of the 2007–08 A-League season, Rukavytsya managed to score six goals in the last eight games of the campaign.

In April 2008 he was invited to trial with Hannover 96 in Germany. It ultimately proved unsuccessful, and he returned to Perth Glory for the start of the 2008–09 season.

In January 2009, he undertook a week-long trial at Dutch club FC Twente. After the last game of the 2008–09 A-League season, it was announced that he would officially be transferring to FC Twente in a transfer deal rumoured to be worth A$1.2 Million.

Rukavytsya scored his first goal for FC Twente in the club's 8–0 Dutch Cup drubbing of SC Joure. On 8 January 2010, KSV Roeselare signed the Australian forward on loan until the end of the season.

On 14 July 2010, Rukavytsya signed for 2. Bundesliga side Hertha BSC. His first season in the 2. Bundesliga was quite successful. He was a regular starter, scored four goals and ended the season with 12 assists, the second most in the league. At season's end, Hertha BSC were promoted back to the Bundesliga and he hoped to feature again for the newly promoted team.

On 31 August, Nikita signed with Bundesliga club Mainz 05 for a reported fee of €1 million, just hours before the transfer cut-off. His last appearance for Berlin was 72 minutes against Jahn Regensburg in the 2. Bundesliga on 24 August 2012.

Rukavytsya joined Frankfurt on a year-long loan deal in August 2013, after failing to break into the Mainz first eleven.

On 12 October 2014, it was announced that Rukavytsya had returned to Australia to sign for the Western Sydney Wanderers. He made his debut in round 3 against Wellington Phoenix. His first goal for the Wanderers came in round 16 against Wellington Phoenix.

In September 2015, Rukavytsya signed for Israeli side Beitar Jerusalem.

On 8 June 2016, after one season with Beitar Jerusalem, Rukavytsya joined Maccabi Haifa on a three-year deal worth €400,000 per season.

After an unsuccessful 2016–17 season, the following season he scored nine goals in the first five months, including the final goal in a 3–0 cup win over rivals Maccabi Tel Aviv.

In the 2019–20 season, Rukavytsya finished top goal scorer in the league with a total of 22 goals.

In the 2020–21 season, Maccabi Haifa won the league and Rukavytsya again won the golden boot with a total of 19 goals in the league.

In March 2022, Rukavytsya became the leading foreign goalscorer in the Israeli Premier League.

International career
While eligible to play for Ukraine, he decided to play for Australia and in 2008, represented Australia in the Australian U-23's Olympic Team at the 2008 Summer Olympics, locking his commitment to Australia.

After a good end to the 2007–08 season, he earned himself a place in the Olyroos squad for the Beijing Olympics and a Socceroos call-up.

Rukavytsya scored in a warm-up game for the Olyroos against Adelaide United. He also scored his first international goal for the Australian U-23's, in their 3–0 win over Croatian U-21's at the Intercontinental Cup in Malaysia on 16 May 2008.

Rukavytsya was named in Pim Verbeek's 23-man squad for the 2010 World Cup in South Africa. He made two appearances off the bench for the Socceroos.

Rukavytsya scored his first international goal in a friendly against South Korea on 14 November 2012, Australia won 2–1.

In May 2018, he was named in Australia's preliminary 26-man squad for the 2018 FIFA World Cup in Russia.

On 7 June 2021, Rukavytsya came on as a substitute in a World Cup Qualifier against Taiwan.

Career statistics

Club

International

Scores and results list Australia's goal tally first, score column indicates score after each Rukavytsya goal.

Honours
FC Twente
 Eredivisie: 2009–10

Hertha BSC
 2. Bundesliga: 2010–11

Maccabi Haifa
 Israeli Premier League: 2020–21

Hapoel Be'er Sheva
 Israeli State Cup: 2021–22

Individual
 Harry Kewell Medal: 2008–09
 PFA A-League Team of the Year: 2008–09
 Israeli Premier League top-goalscorer: 2019–20, 2020–21

References

External links
 
 
 Nikita Rukavytsya at Aussie Footballers
 
 
 
 

1987 births
Living people
A-League Men players
Australian soccer players
Olympic soccer players of Australia
Australia international soccer players
Ukrainian footballers
Perth Glory FC players
FC Twente players
K.S.V. Roeselare players
Hertha BSC players
1. FSV Mainz 05 players
1. FSV Mainz 05 II players
FSV Frankfurt players
Western Sydney Wanderers FC players
Beitar Jerusalem F.C. players
Maccabi Haifa F.C. players
Hapoel Be'er Sheva F.C. players
Bundesliga players
2. Bundesliga players
Belgian Pro League players
Eredivisie players
Israeli Premier League players
Australian expatriate soccer players
Expatriate footballers in Belgium
Expatriate footballers in Germany
Expatriate footballers in the Netherlands
Australian expatriate sportspeople in Belgium
Australian expatriate sportspeople in Germany
Australian Institute of Sport soccer players
Ukrainian expatriate footballers
People educated at Mount Lawley Senior High School
Footballers at the 2008 Summer Olympics
2010 FIFA World Cup players
Sportspeople from Mykolaiv
Ukrainian emigrants to Australia
Naturalised citizens of Australia
Association football wingers
Association football forwards
Australia under-20 international soccer players
Ukrainian expatriate sportspeople in Germany
Australian expatriate sportspeople in Israel
Ukrainian expatriate sportspeople in Israel
Expatriate footballers in Israel
Ukrainian expatriate sportspeople in the Netherlands
Ukrainian expatriate sportspeople in Belgium
Soccer players from Perth, Western Australia
Naturalized citizens of Israel
Inglewood United FC players